Art of War Undisputed Arena Fighting Championship: Art of War 2 was the second mixed martial arts event by the mixed martial arts organization Art of War Undisputed Arena Fighting Championship. The event took place on Saturday, May 11, 2007 at the Austin Convention Center in Austin, Texas.  The card aired on HDTV.

History 
The fight card included Chris Guillen and Wes Sims in the main event.  The show also featured a bout between David Loiseau and Freddie Espircueta.

Results

References 

2007 in mixed martial arts
Mixed martial arts events
Mixed martial arts in Texas